Sportkanalen was a sports channel started by Kinnevik on 23 March 1996 and is considered the predecessor to Viasat Sport. Its main competitor was the sports channel SuperSport.

The channel closed on 30 December 1996.

External links
Sportkanaler kommer og går

Defunct television channels in Norway
Television stations in Denmark
Modern Times Group
Defunct television channels in Sweden
Television channels and stations established in 1996
Television channels and stations disestablished in 1996
1996 establishments in Norway
1996 disestablishments in Norway